The 9th Weather Reconnaissance Wing  is an inactive United States Air Force organization.  Its last assignment was with Air Weather Service at McClellan Air Force Base, California, where it was inactivated on 31 August 1975.

History 
Weather reconnaissance units were assigned to two different units numbered nine, the 9th Weather Reconnaissance Group and the 9th Weather Reconnaissance Wing

The group was first activated as the 9th Weather Group in 1953 at Andrews Air Force Base, and was responsible for providing weather observation and forecasting services for units of Air Research and Development Command.  In 1957, the group moved to Scott Air Force Base, Illinois and provided similar services for units of Military Air Transport Service.

In July 1961, the group moved to McClellan Air Force Base, California, where it was redesignated 9th Weather Reconnaissance Group and assumed responsibilities for Air Weather Service's worldwide reconnaissance mission.

On 8 July 1965 the 9th Weather Reconnaissance Wing was activated at McClellan Air Force Base, California and assumed the mission, personnel and equipment of the 9th Weather Reconnaissance Group.

Supported units flying into tropical storms and typhoons in the Atlantic, Pacific and Indian Oceans. Supported unit deployments overseas and space launches from Florida by supporting units flying along routes to provide weather data since. Supported units conducting atmospheric sampling and flying some non-weather reconnaissance and search and rescue missions over the Arctic, Atlantic, Pacific and Indian Oceans.

The 9th wing was inactivated in 1975 and its personnel, equipment and mission were transferred to the 41st Rescue and Weather Reconnaissance Wing.

Lineage
9th Weather Reconnaissance Group
 Constituted as the 9th Weather Group in 1952
 Activated on 20 April 1952
 Redesignated 9th Weather Reconnaissance Group on 1 September 1961
 Inactivated on 8 July 1965

9th Weather Reconnaissance Wing
 Constituted as the 9th Weather Reconnaissance Wing on 4 May 1965 (not organized)
 Organized on 8 July 1965
 Inactivated on 1 September 1975

Assignments 
 Air Weather Service, 20 April 1952 - 8 July 1965
 Air Weather Service, 8 July 1965 - 31 August 1975

Stations 
 Andrews Air Force Base, Maryland, 20 April 1952
 Scott Air Force Base, Illinois, 1 October 1957
 McClellan Air Force Base, California,  1 July 1961 - 31 August 1975

Components
 53d Weather Reconnaissance Squadron:  20 April 1953 - 25 November 1953, 8 January 1962 - 8 July 1965, 8 July 1965 - 31 August 1975
 Kindley Air Force Base, Bermuda, 8 January 1962
 Hunter Air Force Base, Georgia, 31 August 1963
 Ramey Air Force Base, Puerto Rico, 15 June 1966
 Keesler Air Force Base, Mississippi, 1 July 1973 - 31 August 1975
 54th Weather Reconnaissance Squadron: 8 February 1962 - 8 July 1965, 8 July 1965 -31 August 1975
 Andersen Air Force Base, Guam, 8 February 1962 - 31 August 1975
 55th Weather Reconnaissance Squadron: 20 April 1953 - 8 July 1961, 8 January 1962 - 8 July 1965, 8 July 1965 -31 August 1975
 56th Weather Reconnaissance Squadron:  1 February 1960 - 8 July 1965, 8 July 1965 - 15 January 1972
 Yokota Air Base, Japan, 8 February 1962 - 15 January 1972
 57th Weather Reconnaissance Squadron: 8 February 1962 – 8 July 1965, 8 July 1965 - 10 November 1969
 Kirtland Air Force Base, New Mexico, 8 February 1962
 RAAF Base Laverton, Laverton, Victoria, Australia, 1 September 1963 - 9 July 1965
 Avalon Airport, Melbourne, Victoria, Australia, 9 July 1965
 Hickam Air Force Base, Hawaii, 15 September 1965 – 10 November 1969
 58th Weather Reconnaissance Squadron: 15 April 1963 - 8 July 1965, 8 July 1965 - 1 July 1974
 Kirtland Air Force Base, New Mexico
 1211th Test Squadron (Sampling), 7 August 1962 - 8 June 1963
 Kirtland Air Force Base, New Mexico

Aircraft

 WB-50D Superfortress, 1955-1965
 WB-47E Stratojet, 1963-1969
 WB-57D Canberra, 1964
 RB-57F Canberra, 1964-1958

 WB-57F Canberra, 1968-1974
 WC-135 Stratotanker, 196?-1975
 WC-130 Hercules, 1965-1975

Notes

References 

 
 9th Weather Reconnaissance Wing

Weather wings of the United States Air Force
Military units and formations established in 1965